Byberry may refer to:

Byberry, Missouri
Byberry, Philadelphia